The Capt. W. F. Purdy House is a historic home in Sarasota, Florida. It is located at 3315 Bayshore Road. On March 22, 1984, it was added to the U.S. National Register of Historic Places.

References

External links
 Sarasota County listings at National Register of Historic Places

Houses in Sarasota, Florida
Houses on the National Register of Historic Places in Sarasota County, Florida
American Craftsman architecture in Florida
Houses completed in 1912
1912 establishments in Florida